David W. Tracy (born 1939) is an American theologian and Roman Catholic priest. He is Andrew Thomas Greeley and Grace McNichols Greeley Distinguished Service Professor Emeritus of Catholic Studies at the University of Chicago Divinity School. In 2020 he was elected to the American Philosophical Society.

Early life and education 
David Tracy was born on January 6, 1939, to John Charles Tracy and Eileen Marie Tracy (née Rossell) in Yonkers, New York. He had two brothers, John Jr. and Arthur. His father was a union organizer who liked to read Henry Adams to his children.

Feeling an intense call to the priesthood as an adolescent, Tracy started attending the Cathedral School in 1952. The Cathedral School served as a high school and minor seminary for the Archdiocese of New York. In 1960, he left New York for Rome to study at the Gregorianum. His vocation to study theology was profoundly encouraged by the Second Vatican Council taking place at that time. He was ordained in Rome on December 18, 1963, and served in the diocese of Bridgeport, Connecticut, in 1963. Tracy received his Licentiate of Sacred Theology from the Gregorianum in 1964, after which he spent one year at a parish in Stamford, Connecticut. He has said that he had always wanted to work in a parish, but during his one year of doing so, he felt a strong call to the academic life. He returned to Rome and received his doctorate from the Gregorian University in 1969.

Career 
Tracy's first academic teaching appointment was a lectureship at the Catholic University of America in Washington, DC, where he began in 1967.  In 1968, Tracy joined with Bernard McGinn and twenty other professors at CUA in rejecting Pope Paul VI's encyclical Humanae vitae.  He and the others were tried by CUA's faculty senate and summarily fired. They sued the university, were represented by American Civil Liberties Union lawyers, and ultimately won their case.

In the midst of this trial, Jerald Brauer, then dean of the University of Chicago Divinity School, convinced Tracy (as well as McGinn) to come to the University of Chicago.  In 1985, Tracy was named a Distinguished Service Professor there, and in 1987, a Distinguished Service Professor of Roman Catholic Studies.  Tracy also held the Andrew Thomas Greeley and Grace McNichols Greeley Professorship in Roman Catholic Studies, which was established in 1984 by Roman Catholic priest, sociologist and novelist Andrew Greeley. He also served on Chicago's Committee on the Analysis of Ideas and Methods and the Committee on Social Thought. Tracy remained at the Divinity School until his retirement in late 2006.

Tracy served as president of the Catholic Theological Society of America from 1976 to 1977. In 1980, that organization awarded him the John Courtney Murray Award, the highest award of the society. In 1982, he was elected to the American Academy of Arts and Sciences.

In 1999–2000, Tracy gave the Gifford Lectures at the University of Edinburgh. The title of his lectures was This Side of God.  The Gifford Lectures are widely considered to be the highest honor for those working in theology and religious studies.

In 2018, Tracy contributed an essay to the catalog of the Metropolitan Museum of Art exhibition Heavenly Bodies: Fashion and the Catholic Imagination. Tracy was described by Andrew Bolton, the curator of the exhibition, as "the J. D. Salinger of the theological world."

Writings 
 The Achievement of Bernard Lonergan (1970)
 Blessed Rage for Order: The New Pluralism in Theology (1975)
 Toward Vatican III: The Work that Needs To Be Done, with Hans Küng and Johann Baptist Metz (1978)
 The Analogical Imagination: Christian Theology and the Culture of Pluralism (1981)
 Talking About God: Doing Theology in the Context of Modern Pluralism, with John Cobb (1983)
 Short History of the Interpretation of the Bible, with Robert Grant (1984)
 A Catholic Vision, with Stephen Happel (1984)
 Plurality and Ambiguity  (1987)
 Dialogue with the Other: The Inter-religious Dialogue (1990)
 On Naming the Present: God, Hermeneutics, and Church (1994)

References

Footnotes

Bibliography

External links 
 David Tracy's Faculty Profile at the University of Chicago Divinity School
 
 This Side of God: A Conversation with David Tracy

20th-century American Roman Catholic theologians
University of Chicago Divinity School faculty
Living people
1939 births
Catholic University of America faculty
People from Yonkers, New York 
Pontifical Gregorian University alumni
Gifford Lectures
Public theologians
Members of the American Philosophical Society
Presidents of the Catholic Theological Society of America
21st-century American Roman Catholic theologians